Denis Tardif is a Canadian politician, who was elected to the National Assembly of Quebec in the 2018 provincial election. He represents the electoral district of Rivière-du-Loup–Témiscouata as a member of the Coalition Avenir Québec.

Tardif previous worked as a regional organizer for the Conservative Party of Canada and served as a municipal councillor in Rivière-du-Loup between 2005 and 2011.

On December 17, 2020, he was removed from the CAQ caucus, following the release of a video showing him in a large private gathering, maskless and not socially distancing amid the COVID-19 pandemic in Quebec. He was reinstated into the caucus on April 12, 2021.

References

Living people
Coalition Avenir Québec MNAs
21st-century Canadian politicians
People from Rivière-du-Loup
Quebec municipal councillors
Year of birth missing (living people)
Politicians affected by a party expulsion process